Ketchikan Gateway Borough is a borough located in the U.S. state of Alaska. As of the 2020 census its  population was 13,948, up from 13,477 in 2010. The borough seat is Ketchikan. The borough is the second most populous borough in Southeast Alaska, the first being Juneau Borough.

Ketchikan Gateway Borough comprises the Ketchikan, AK Micropolitan Statistical Area.

Geography
On May 19, 2008, a large part of the former Prince of Wales–Outer Ketchikan Census Area was annexed, including the remainder of Misty Fjords National Monument that was not already in the borough, making the current figures much larger than these. A map of the current area can be seen here:

Adjacent boroughs and census areas
 Prince of Wales–Hyder Census Area, AK – east, west
 City and Borough of Wrangell, AK – north
 Kitimat–Stikine Regional District, BC – east
 Skeena–Queen Charlotte Regional District, BC – south

National protected areas
 Tongass National Forest – partly
 Misty Fjords National Monument
 Misty Fjords National Monument Wilderness

Demographics

As of census of 2010, there were 13,477 people, 5,305 households, and 3,369 families residing in the borough. The population density was 11 people per square mile (4/km2). There were 6,166 housing units at an average density of 5 per square mile (2/km2). The racial makeup of the borough was 68.7% White, 0.7% Black or African American, 14.3% Native American, 7.1% Asian (5.8% Filipino, 0.3% Chinese, 0.2% Japanese), 0.2% Pacific Islander (0.1% Hawaiian), 0.7% from other races, and 8.3% from two or more races. 4.3% of the population were Hispanic or Latino of any race. 3.31% reported speaking Tagalog at home, while 1.65% speak Spanish.

The median income for a household in the city was $61,695, and the median income for a family was $45,417. Males had a median income of $35,139 versus $37,500 for females. The per capita income for the city was $29,520. About 8.3% of the population were below the poverty line.

In 2000, there were 5,399 households, out of which 36.80% had children under the age of 18 living with them, 51.50% were married couples living together, 11.30% had a female householder with no husband present, and 32.70% were non-families. 26.10% of all households were made up of individuals, and 6.20% had someone living alone who was 65 years of age or older. The average household size was 2.56, and the average family size was 3.10.

In the borough, the population was spread out, with 28.20% under the age of 18, 7.50% from 18 to 24, 31.40% from 25 to 44, 25.10% from 45 to 64, and 7.90% who were 65 years of age or older. The median age was 36 years. For every 100 females, there were 104.50 males. For every 100 females age 18 and over, there were 105.30 males.

Communities

Cities

 Ketchikan (Borough seat)
 Saxman

Unincorporated communities

 Loring
 Ward Cove

Government and Politics

Ketchikan Gateway Borough is strongly conservative, and has voted Republican all but once since statehood in 1959.

See also

 Ketchikan Gateway Borough School District
 List of airports in the Ketchikan Gateway Borough
 National Register of Historic Places listings in Ketchikan Gateway Borough, Alaska

References

External links
 

 
1963 establishments in Alaska
Populated places established in 1963